Sebastian Strózik (born 15 May 1999) is a Polish professional footballer who plays as a forward for Cracovia.

Honours

Club
Cracovia
Polish Cup: 2019–20

References

Polish footballers
1999 births
Living people
Association football midfielders
MKS Cracovia (football) players
Resovia (football) players
Ekstraklasa players
I liga players
III liga players
Poland youth international footballers
Sportspeople from Opole